Nazarabad County is in Alborz province, Iran. The capital of the county is the city of Nazarabad. At the 2006 census, when it was a county in Tehran province, its population was 128,666 in 32,373 households. At the 2016 census, the county's population was 152,437 in 46,658 households, by which time the county had become a part of recently established Alborz province.

Administrative divisions

The population history and structural changes of Nazarabad County's administrative divisions over two censuses are shown in the following table. The latest census shows two districts, five rural districts, and two cities.

References 

 

Counties of Alborz Province